The Bureau of Cannabis Control (established as Bureau of Marijuana Control under Proposition 64, formerly the Bureau of Medical Marijuana Regulation) is an agency of the State of California within the Department of Consumer Affairs, charged with regulating medical cannabis (MMJ) in accordance with state law pursuant to the Medical Cannabis Regulation and Safety Act passed by the legislature in 2015 (amended in 2016) and the Adult Use of Marijuana Act (Proposition 64), passed by voter initiative in November 2016. The agency was charged with creating rules for the legal non-medical market to take effect January 1, 2018; and to regulate the state's multibillion dollar medical program  for the first time. The first agency leader, Lori Ajax, referred to in multiple media outlets as the state's cannabis "czar", was appointed by the governor in February 2017. State senator Mike McGuire has expressed doubt that the board would meet deadlines to allow regulated retail sales by 2018 as planned.

When the agency published emergency rules on November 16, 2017 under  California Code of Regulations, Title 16, Division 42, it effectively became the Bureau of Cannabis Control.

Footnotes

References

Sources
California Proposition 64, Marijuana Legalization (2016) at Ballotpedia, accessed May 1, 2016

External links

2016 establishments in California
2016 in cannabis
Cannabis in California
State agencies of California
Cannabis regulatory agencies